Alan or Allen Davey may refer to:

* Alan Davey (civil servant), chief executive of the Arts Council England
 Alan Davey (musician) (born 1963), former bassist with Hawkwind
 Allen M. Davey, Academy Award-winning cinematographer